Sergeant First Class Elmelindo Rodrigues Smith (July 27, 1935 – February 16, 1967) was a United States Army soldier, of Hispanic-Asian descent, who was posthumously awarded the Medal of Honor for his actions in the Vietnam War. Despite being severely wounded, Smith inspired his men to beat back an enemy assault.

Early years
Smith, an American of Hispanic/Asian descent, was born in Wahiawa, a town located in the center of Oahu Island in the County of Honolulu, Hawaii. There he received his primary and secondary education graduating from Leilehua High School. He joined the United States Army in 1953 and was stationed in various countries overseas, among them was Okinawa.

During his stay in Okinawa, he met a Hawaiian born WAC by the name of Jane and soon they were married. They established their home in a military post in Tacoma, Washington and had two daughters.

Vietnam War
On July 23, 1966, Smith was sent to the Republic of Vietnam and served as Platoon Sergeant of the 1st Platoon, Company C, 2nd Battalion, 8th Infantry of the 4th Infantry Division. The division conducted combat operations in the western Central Highlands along the border between Cambodia and Vietnam. The division experienced intense combat against North Vietnamese Army (NVA) regular forces in the mountains surrounding Kontum.

On February 16, 1967, Sergeant Smith was leading his platoon in a reconnaissance patrol, when suddenly it came under attack. NVA forces attacked the patrol with machinegun, mortar and rocket fire. Despite the fact that he was wounded, he coordinated a counterattack by positioning his men and distributing ammunition. He was struck by a rocket, but continued to expose himself in order to direct his men's fire upon the approaching enemy. Even though he perished from his wounds, his actions resulted in the defeat of the enemy.

For his actions, he was recommended for the Medal of Honor. In October 1968, his family received the medal from the hands of Secretary of the Army Stanley R. Resor, because President Lyndon B. Johnson was ill at the time. However, after the ceremony, which was held at the White House, the family which included his widow Jane and two daughters, Kathleen 10 and Pamela 6, were taken to President Johnson's bedroom.

Medal of Honor citation

Postscript
Sergeant First Class Elmelindo Rodrigues Smith's remains were buried with full military honors in the National Memorial Cemetery of the Pacific located in Honolulu, Hawaii. His name is inscribed in the Vietnam War Memorial located in Washington, D.C. in Panel 15E – Row 051.

Awards and recognitions
Among Smith's decorations and medals are the following:

 

Foreign unit decorations
  Fourragère cord

See also

List of Medal of Honor recipients for the Vietnam War
Hispanic Medal of Honor recipients

Notes

References

External links
 

1935 births
1967 deaths
United States Army Medal of Honor recipients
American people of Puerto Rican descent
American people of Spanish descent
People from Honolulu County, Hawaii
American military personnel of Asian descent
United States Army personnel of the Vietnam War
American military personnel killed in the Vietnam War
Vietnam War recipients of the Medal of Honor
United States Army soldiers
Burials in the National Memorial Cemetery of the Pacific